Ajan Shir Melli (also Romanized as Ajan Shīr Mellī and Ājan Shīr Melī) is a village in Qaravolan Rural District, Loveh District, Galikash County, Golestan Province, Iran. At the 2006 census, its population was 286, in 62 families.

References 

Populated places in Galikash County